Jan Bekkenk (born 29 March 1949) is a Dutch modern pentathlete. He competed at the 1972 Summer Olympics.

References

External links
 

1949 births
Living people
Dutch male modern pentathletes
Olympic modern pentathletes of the Netherlands
Modern pentathletes at the 1972 Summer Olympics
People from Schoonhoven
Sportspeople from South Holland